Le disque d'or de Dalida is the fifth album of Dalida, containing hits like "Ciao, ciao Bambina," the classic "Come prima (Tu me donnes)," the Hebrew folk song "Hava naguila (Dansons mon amour)," "Guitare et tambourin" and "Amstramgram".

Track listing 
Barclay – 80106, 065 523-0:

See also 
 Dalida albums discography

References 

Dalida albums
1959 albums
French-language albums
Barclay (record label) albums